Competitive play in Pokémon generally refers to player versus player battles that take place using the Pokémon video games. Players construct a team of Pokémon as defined by a specific set of rules and battle as they would in the game until all Pokémon on a player's team have fainted or when a player resigns. These battles are usually done through the consoles in which the games are played in (e.g. the Nintendo 3DS or Nintendo Switch), or online through fan-made simulators such as Pokémon Showdown!.

The official tournament circuit for competitive play is known as the Video Game Championships (VGC), which was established in 2009 by The Pokémon Company International under their Play! Pokémon program. Players from all over the world compete in local tournaments and qualifiers to earn cash prizes, scholarships, as well as an invitation to the annual Pokémon World Championships, an invite-only esports tournament that aside from the Pokémon video games also features the Pokémon Trading Card Game, Pokémon Unite and Pokémon Go. All VGC tournament matches are played with the 'double battle' format, where two Pokémon from a player's team will battle two other Pokémon from the opponent at any one time. In addition, the rules typically change every year to account for new game releases, with the 2023 Pokémon World Championships set to be played on Pokémon Scarlet and Violet in Yokohama.

In contrast, the largest fan-base in the English-speaking community dedicated to competitive play is Smogon University, which curates its own set of competitive formats and hosts unofficial tournaments for its own players. The competitive formats are mostly fan-driven and established by the community with Pokémon and strategies seen as too powerful being banned through popular consensus and voting, and Pokémon being placed into tiers according to how often they are used in battle, allowing weaker Pokémon to be used successfully in lower-tier formats. Unlike official tournament play, players have the option of choosing any format they wish to play in, and any Pokémon at or below the tier chosen can be used.

Mechanics

Pokémon stats

Each Pokémon possesses six stats: HP, Attack, Defense, Special Attack, Special Defense, and Speed.

Prior to Generation IV, the damage category of a move (physical or special) was determined by the type of the move itself (for example, all Rock-type moves were physical, and all Dragon-type moves were special). The physical/special split in Generation IV allowed moves to be physical or special depending on the nature of the attack rather than the move's type. This was a huge change to competitive battling, with Pokémon such as Gengar or Gyarados benefiting, and Alakazam suffering. As competitive battling features human players, the style of battling is much different, with players choosing their set of four moves and one item based not only on the Pokémon's stats, but based on sets other players might run in order to counter them.

Every Pokémon has a Nature which has the potential to increase one stat by 10% and decrease another stat by 10% above a base amount. In addition, hidden attributes called EVs and IVs are used to alter stats in competitive Pokémon, usually maximizing them. EVs are earned by battling and defeating other Pokémon (with each Pokémon having a specific set of EVs they give), and IVs are assigned by the game when you obtain a Pokémon (the higher the number, the better the stats become above a set minimum amount).

Moves
Moves that have high base power but huge drawbacks, such as Giga Impact's recharge turn and Thunder's risky accuracy, are not always viable in competitive play. Instead, moves that have reliable accuracy, minimal downsides, and have decent base power, such as Body Slam and Thunderbolt, respectively, are used instead. The introduction of Mega Evolution gave previously non-viable or less viable Pokémon a purpose in the upper-tier metagame, such as Charizard and Mawile, although this mechanic (which was introduced in Generation VI), along with Z-moves (ultra-powerful moves of a particular type which could be performed by any Pokémon when holding a specific item and was introduced in Generation VII) were removed in Generation VIII. Dynamaxing was a new mechanic introduced in Generation VIII; once per battle, each player could increase one Pokémon's HP (by up to 100%) and upgrade its moves to Max Moves (powerful moves with extra effects based on the move's type). Some players, especially followers of Smogon University, criticised this mechanic and prohibit the use of it in certain formats. Certain types in early editions of the games, such as Psychic in Generation I and Dragon in Generations IV and V, were exceptionally powerful and a clear cut above the rest due to either lack of weaknesses or being resisted by only one type. Psychic was resisted by itself and Dragon was only resisted by Steel. The various types are more balanced in present metagames, although certain types are better in certain circumstances (such as Ice for offense and Steel for defense). In addition, because the now-split Special Attack and Special Defense stats were combined into one Special stat in Generation I, Pokémon with a high Special stat could both deal and resist Special damage extremely well (or if low, be extremely weak in both Special offense and defense).

Rules
Rulesets vary between the official tournament circuit for Pokémon, the Video Game Championships, and the competitive formats maintained by the fan made institution, Smogon University.

Video Game Championships
The rules for VGC are provided by The Pokémon Company directly. Rulesets for VGC vary throughout the lifespan of a Pokémon game and are released in periodic updates. Depending on the series, certain restrictions on game mechanics or the use of certain Pokémon may be placed or lifted. Restricted mechanics have included the banning of Dynamax, Z-Crystals, and Mega Stones. Lifted restrictions have included the allowance of a limited number of restricted Legendary Pokemon per team.

VGC matches always use a double battle format. Each player sends out two Pokémon at a time and may target any or all Pokémon on the field. Players must choose four Pokémon from their own team of six for each tournament battle. Prior to choosing which four Pokémon will participate in battle, players may also view the opponent's team of six Pokémon on the team preview screen. Pokémon on the same team may not hold identical items. Teams may not use multiple of the same Pokémon. Pokémon are always set to level 50 in battle regardless of what level they are in offline gameplay. Mythical Pokémon have never been allowed for use in VGC, until the Series 13 ruleset for Pokémon Sword and Shield's ranked battles was announced.

During a battle, there are three timers running. One timer is the battle clock. If the battle clock reaches zero, the winner will be decided based on either which player has more Pokémon available to battle, or if each player has the same number of Pokémon left, the winner will be decided based on the hit points of the remaining Pokémon averaged over the total hit points of the team. Another timer is the turn timer, known in-game as Your Time. This timer limits the duration of the turn. If the timer expires, the player who still has some time left wins. The third timer is an action timer for the player. The player must switch Pokémon or choose a move for their Pokémon to use before the timer reaches zero or the Pokémon's first move in its move-set will be automatically selected, like the Your Time timer.

Smogon University

Rules
Rules for competitive play on the Smogon battle simulator Pokémon Showdown! are generally created and agreed upon by the community of Smogon users. They vary by metagame, tier, and tournament type.

Standard Clauses
Certain rules known as the "standard clauses" apply almost universally to Smogon tournaments and battles on the Pokémon Showdown! ladders. These include:
 Sleep Clause: Prevents players from putting another opposing Pokémon to sleep if there is already a sleeping Pokémon on the opposing team.
 Species Clause: Prevents players from using multiple of the same Pokémon species on their team, regardless of Pokémon forme.
 Evasion Clause: Prevents players from using moves (and items, in certain tiers) that boost a Pokémon's evasion.
 OHKO Clause: Prevents the use of "one-hit KO" moves that cause a Pokémon to faint in one turn while ignoring stats or type resistances.
 Endless Battle Clause: Prevents players from exploiting specific game scenarios that create battles that cannot end.
 Dynamax Clause: Prevents players from Dynamaxing their Pokémon (only applicable in Generation 8).

Usage-based Tiers
Under the most popular Smogon rulesets, Pokémon are tiered by their usage rate on the Pokémon Showdown! ladder. Pokémon in higher tiers are not legal for use in lower tiers, but Pokémon in lower tiers may be used in the tier they have been placed in or any above it. Every usage-based tier besides Over Used has a ban list (abbreviated to BL), which contains Pokémon that the player base has decided are detrimental to the tier due to a lack of Pokémon able to counter it, but do not have enough usage in higher tiers to be officially placed in one. The usage-based tiers are ranked as follows:
 Over Used (OU): The baseline usage-based tier, a Pokémon is considered OU if a player has a better than 50% chance of seeing that Pokémon at least once over 15 battles. Pokémon are set to level 100. Any Pokémon, move, or game mechanic not banned to AG or Ubers may be used in OU.
 Ubers: Functions as the OU ban list as well as its own tier. Most Pokémon in Ubers are Legendary Pokémon, though some non-Legendary Pokémon have also been banned from OU in past generation metas. Though extremely strong Pokémon are available in the tier, a few Pokémon and many moves and game mechanics deemed uncompetitive (such as Baton Pass and Dynamax) are banned.
 Anything Goes (AG): Anything Goes functions as the Ubers ban list. AG has the fewest restrictions of Smogon's tiers, with only the Endless Battle Clause being present. All other game mechanics, moves, and Pokémon banned from lower tiers are allowed. Only two Pokémon have ever been banned from Ubers to Anything Goes: Zacian in Generation 8 and Mega Rayquaza in Generations 6 and 7.
 Under Used (UU): Any Pokémon or mechanic not in AG, Ubers, OU, or the UU banlist (UUBL) may be used.
 Rarely Used (RU): Any Pokémon or mechanic not in AG, Ubers, OU, or UUBL, UU or the RU banlist (RUBL) may be used.
 Never Used (NU): Any Pokémon or mechanic not in AG, Ubers, OU, or UUBL, UU, RUBL, RU, or the NU banlist (NUBL) may be used.
 Potentially Used (PU): Any Pokémon or mechanic not in AG, Ubers, OU, or UUBL, UU, RUBL, RU, NUBL, NU or the PU banlist (PUBL) may be used. Pokémon that do not meet the usage threshold to be considered PU is referred to as being Untiered and are generally not recommended for use in competitive play.

Official Metagames
Aside from the standard usage-based tiers, Smogon users also curate a set of metagames with special rulesets that are not tiered by usage:
 Little Cup (LC): Any first stage evolution Pokémon (Magby, Porygon, Elekid, for instance) may be used, provided they can evolve (so single-stage evolutions like Ditto and Togedemaru are not allowed). This format is played with all Pokémon set to level 5, so a Pokémon must also be obtainable in-game at level 5 or below to be usable (making Type: Null illegal despite being a first-stage evolvable Pokémon). 
 Doubles OU (DOU): The baseline doubles format of Smogon, Doubles OU is similar to OU in every respect except that each player has two Pokémon on the field at the same time. Unlike most official VGC formats, Doubles OU is a bring six use six level 100 metagame. It also forgoes the standard Sleep Clause for a Gravity Sleep Clause, which prevents the use of sleep-inducing moves in conjunction with the Gravity field effect. 
 Monotype: Similar to OU in every respect except for the addition of the Same Type Clause, which dictates that every Pokémon on a player's team share a specific type with every other Pokémon on the team. A dual-type Pokemon like the Flying- and Normal-type Staraptor would be eligible for both mono-Normal and mono-Flying teams.

UK Pokémon Regional championships
The UK and Ireland Pokémon Championships is an event held by Nintendo in the United Kingdom and Ireland. Regional competitions were held in several regions around the countries. Contestants would fight in a tournament using the Pokémon game that was popular during the time of the event.

Pokémon Championship 2000
The first championship was held during the summer of 2000. Players were invited to register and take part in regional finals during the months of July and August, but were restricted to using Pokémon Red and Blue. Battles were played using Pokémon Stadium and were subject to several championship and battle rules. Anyone visiting the regional events was allowed to download Mew onto their Pokémon Red or Blue cartridge (this was limited to one per person).

The regionals were held in 14 cities during the months of June and August 2000. In each regional event, players won a gym badge based on the badges earned in Pokémon Red and Blue. Each regional consisted of eight rounds, with the winner of the final having all eight gym badges (the runner-up with seven). The winner and runner-up of each regional both represent their region for the final in London.

A special event took place at Merryhill Dudley where a game of each version was given away to two random contestants. Red version was won by Richard Borgens, while Blue version was given to a young Arab tourist. The final was held on 1 September 2000 at the Millennium Dome, where the regional finals battled against each other in a final competition. The winner of the national competition represented the UK and Ireland in the European final, which was hosted the following day, and the World Championships later that month.

2006 Regionals
Regional battle events were held in April 2006 and the players competed for cards and electronic games. The largest regionals were held in London and Bournemouth. The 15 years and over winners are listed as follows;

Scotland (Glasgow)

2nd - Fred Entenmann

3rd - Andrew Ritchie

4th - Gordon White

North East (Hull)

1st - Andy Stone

North West (Manchester)

1st - Nitish Doolub

London

1st - Sami Sekkoum

South Coast (Bournemouth)

1st - Dominic Jordan

The 11–14 years and over winners are listed as follows:

North East (Hull)

1st - Alex Bramham

References

External links
 Smogon University

Competitive Play
Pokémon
Esports games